is a former Japanese football player. She played for Japan national team.

Club career
Kaneda was born on March 9, 1968. She played for Shimizudaihachi SC and Nissan FC.

National team career
On October 22, 1984, Kaneda debuted for the Japan national team against Australia when she was 16 years old. She played 3 games for Japan until 1986.

National team statistics

References

1968 births
Living people
Japanese women's footballers
Japan women's international footballers
Shimizudaihachi Pleiades players
Nissan FC Ladies players
Women's association footballers not categorized by position